Queensland A10 class 2-4-0 locomotive may refer to:

 Queensland A10 Fairlie class locomotive
 Queensland A10 Ipswich class locomotive